Lima is a Bangladeshi film actress.

Biography
Lima acted in Premjuddho in 1994 where her co-star was Salman Shah. In 1995 she acted in Konyadan where Salman Shah was her co-star too. In the last part of 90s she left Dhallywood. Then she connected herself with the business Beauty Parlour in New Market and Mohammadpur. She is now living in the United States.

Selected filmography
 Goriber Songshar
 Premgeet
 Prem Juddho
 Konnadan
 Judge Barrister

References

Living people
Bangladeshi film actresses
1977 births